Alan Hirsch (born 24 October 1959) is an Australian author, serial entrepreneur, thought leader in the missional church movement, key missions strategist for churches around the world, and founder of numerous global organizations.

Life

Early life 
Hirsch was born into a Jewish family in Johannesburg, South Africa in 1959. He moved to Cape Town, in 1963 where he spent most of his childhood and adolescence. Then, he went to university in Cape Town where he studied business and marketing and moved to Australia in 1983 with his family.  Although his family was not particularly religious, he was very much influenced by his Jewish heritage. He emphasizes Jesus as the Jewish Messiah and makes distinctions between Hebraic and Hellenistic thought.  He served a two-year compulsory call-up in the South African military.  After having moved to Australia, he had a life-changing experience with the Holy Spirit that deeply affected him. Soon after moving, he married Debra.  They have been married and in Christian ministry together for over twenty years.

Education and ministry
During his first year of seminary at the Bible College of Victoria he led a small group of newly converted Christians from various sub-cultures in inner city Melbourne" He maintained involvement with this group throughout his Seminary education.

After graduating, he and his wife were called to go to South Melbourne Church of Christ in 1989.  This church was later renamed "South Melbourne Restoration Community". Hirsch spent the next fifteen years leading this community (with wife Debra). Five years after having begun ministry at SMRC, he became the director of the Department of Mission, Education and Development for the Churches of Christ Victoria and Tasmania Conference. During these years, he and his wife planted two churches on the edges of society for the marginalized and urban poor in Melbourne, Australia.  Neither church is in existence today.  During this time Hirsch pioneered the missional training system called Forge Mission Training Network.  Forge became a strong voice and agency for training younger people in missional thinking in Australia, although is now closed.  Hirsch has now moved to North America (where there are active networks in Canada and the United States).

Alan and Debra maintain that the church in North America will be a major determinant for the continued sustenance and future vitality of the church in the West.

Organizational involvement
Hirsch has been directly involved in numerous organizations in various countries around the world and is a prolific speaker at many universities, networks, conferences, and denominational institutions.  He is:
 The founding director of Forge Mission Training Network International (“Forge"), a missional training center that exists to help "birth and nurture the missional church". This organization trains leaders in the USA, Canada, Australia, Europe and globally.
 The co-founder of Shapevine.com, a ministry of Leadership Journal and Christianity Today that focuses on providing people with missional resources, training and networking opportunities.
 The co-founder and director of Future Travelers, a learning system that helps mega-churches become missional.
 He was "series editor for Baker Books' Shapevine series , IVP's Forge line, and an associate editor of Leadership Journal." https://www.goodreads.com/author/show/56757.Alan_Hirsch
 Increasingly involved in 3 Dimensional Ministries, a company that trains churches and leaders how to do discipleship and mission in an increasingly post-Christian world.
 Co-Founder "and adjunct faculty for the M.A. in Missional Church Movements at Wheaton College (Illinois). He is also adjunct professor at Fuller Seminary, George Fox Seminary, among others, and he lectures frequently throughout Australia, Europe, and the United States." https://www.goodreads.com/author/show/56757.Alan_Hirsch 
 Founder of Movement Leaders Collective, an organization that exists as a "catalyst for movement leadership and a community for movement leaders across gender, geography, race & ethnicity."
 Founder of the hybrid publishing company, 100 Movements.
 Founder of the 5Q Collective: 5Q Central, a website for helping people to discover their spiritual gifts and collaborate with one another.

Key thoughts

"Apostolic Genius" 

Probably Hirsch’s most distinctive contribution was to articulate what can be called a phenomenology of apostolic movements.  By probing the question of what comes together to create exponential, high impact and multiplication movements, he came up with the concept he calls "Apostolic Genius", which is defined as "a unique energy and force saturating phenomenal Jesus movements."  Hirsch defines it elsewhere as "the built-in life force and guiding mechanism of God’s people." As to its phenomenology, it is made up of the symphonious interplay among six core elements, or "mDNA".  These six are explained as follows:

 Jesus is Lord—a confession made by Christians that Jesus is the ruler over every aspect of life (pp. 83–100).  This is the most central element, around which the other five orbit . By locating this at the center, Hirsch asserts that Christology (the whole phenomenon of Jesus’s incarnation, life, teachings, role model, saving and redeeming work in cross and resurrection and return) must be the central defining theology of all Christian movements.
 Disciple making—a practice of becoming like Jesus and leading others to do the same (pp. 101–126). This follows directly from the statement that Jesus is Lord and in essence is the calling of disciples to live in Christ and allowing him to live through them.
 Missional-incarnational impulse—the dual-element of mission and incarnation by which a disciple goes into the surrounding world missionally and embodies the actions of Jesus incarnationally (pp. 127–148). This forms the basis of how a Jesus movement extends itself into the world.
 Apostolic environment—which highlights the catalytic role that the apostolic person plays in both generating and sustaining movemental ecclesiology (pp. 149–178).  Hirsch then highlights the role of Ephesians 4 in movements.  He maintains that missional church requires a missional ministry to generate and sustain it.  The prevailing Pastor-Teacher combination is not generative enough for movemental forms of Christianity, he asserts.
 Organic systems—in contrast with a centralized institution, missional movements are structured more like an interconnected organism than through hierarchical organization.  Organic systems manifest (i) an ethos of a movement (as opposed to institution), (ii) the structure of a network, (iii) spread like viruses and (iv) are reproducing and reproducible.
 Communitas, not community—in contrast with an inward-focused group, communitas is an outward-focused group, who by engaging in various forms of risk and liminality, begin to relate to each other on a significantly deeper level (pp. 217–242).

Hirsch maintains that all six elements are needed to create highly transformative, exponentially growing, missional movements. In his book, he displays that it is critical to think in a systemic way about Apostolic Genius and not see each mDNA as a silver bullet. Rather it takes the whole (Apostolic Genius) to create the kind of movement he is describing.

mDNA
	"mDNA" stands for "missional DNA".    This is the name he gives to the six components of Apostolic Genius as mentioned above.

APEPT (or APEST)

APEPT or APEST is an acronym for the five ministry vocations described in Ephesians 4:11: apostles, prophets, evangelists, pastors/shepherds and teachers. Hirsch has initiated and developed a profiling instrument to help people find their gifting using these five terms. Following his teaching that Jesus has designed the church in such a way that every church (indeed every believer) has everything necessary to get the job done, he maintains that every Christian has all the five ministries latent in them although they will generally only operate from the primary and secondary ones.  Hirsch believes that each believer is made up of a complex of APEPT/APEST callings or ministry, and therefore a profile is never simply one-dimensional, but rather is somewhat nuanced.  Nonetheless (and not without disagreement) they can each be described in such a way:
 Apostles extend the gospel.
 Prophets know God's will.
 Evangelists recruit.
 Pastors (or Shepherds) nurture and protect.
 Teachers understand and explain.

Writings
 The Forgotten Ways: Reactivating the Missional Church
 The Permanent Revolution: Apostolic Imagination and Practice for the 21st Century Church, co-authored with Tim Catchim
 The Permanent Revolution Handbook
 Disciplism 
 The Shaping of Things to Come: Innovation and Mission for the 21st Century, co-authored with Michael Frost
 Untamed (Shapevine) : Reactivating a Missional Form of Discipleship, co-authored with Debra Hirsch
 ReJEsus, co-authored with Michael Frost
 5Q: Reactivating the Original Intelligence and Capacity of the Body of Christ
 Activating 5Q: A User's Guide
 The Forgotten Ways Handbook
 The Leap of Faith
 On the Verge: A Journey into the Apostolic Future of the Church
 ReFramation: Seeing God, People, and Mission through Re-enchanted Frames, co-authored with Mark Nelson
 The Starfish and the Spirit, co-authored with Lance Ford and Rob Wegner
 Right Here, Right Now: Everyday Mission for Everyday People, co-authored with Lance Ford
 Fast Forward to Mission: Frameworks for a Life of Impact

See also
Missional community

References 

1959 births
Australian anti-racism activists
Living people
Missiologists
People from Johannesburg
Protestant missionaries in Australia
Radboud University Nijmegen alumni
South African people of Jewish descent
South African Protestant missionaries